Park Joong-hoon (born March 22, 1966) is a South Korean actor.

Early life and family 
Park was born and raised in Seoul. He was classmates with retired basketball legend Hur Jae at Yongsan High School and attended Chung-Ang University together. Park was part of a "golden generation" of Chung-Ang graduates who went on to establish themselves in the film and television industry: he, Jeon In-hwa and Kim Hee-ae graduated in 1989 while Shin Ae-ra was two years their senior.

Park's wife is Zainichi Korean born in Niigata. He therefore often visits Japan with his family.

Career 
Park started his career as an actor in television drama Sarang (1990).  In the film Cambo (1985).  In 1987, for his performance as a college student in Youth sketch of Mimi and Cheolsu, he won the best new actor award at the Baeksang Arts Awards.

In Chilsu and Mansu (1988),  Park gave a brilliant performance in acting as Chil-soo, who leads his life in agony in the society of that time; it created a shock to Korean society.

His performance in My Love, My Bride (1991) was highly esteemed in the Asia Pacific Film Festival, and Park won the Best actor's award.

Park went to the United States in 1992 to enroll in the graduate school of New York University, majoring in acting education. After getting his master's degree, he returned to Korea and appeared in Two Cops (1993), a box office hit, which brought him and Ahn Sung-ki the best actor award at the Grand Bell Awards.

His performance as a tough police officer in Nowhere to Hide (1999) gave Park the opportunity to appear in a Hollywood film; the film director Jonathan Demme watched this film at Deauville Asian Film Festival, and offered him the role of an Asian villain in The Truth About Charlie (2002), the remake of Stanley Donen's Charade.

In 2006, Park reunited with his Two Cops co-star Ahn Sung-ki in Radio Star, portraying a rock star.  He won the best actor's award of Blue Dragon Film Awards with Ahn but missed Grand Bell Awards; only Ahn got the prize.

From April 11–17, 2007, the event "Park Joong-hoon Mini Retrospective" was held at Jacob Burns Film Center, presenting six films.  It was the first time for an Asian actor retrospective to be held there.  During the event, Park had talk sessions with Jonathan Demme and Ahn Sung-ki.

Near the end of decade, Park came back into the limelight with Haeundae (2009), Korea's first disaster film that situates itself in a tsunami coming to the popular beach of Busan.

Park is opposed to reducing Screen quota, along with Ahn Sung-ki, Choi Min-sik and others; he became second actor (the first is Ahn, and the third is Choi) of relay demonstration by actors and film directors, on February 5, 2006.

Filmography

Television

Film

Talk show

Variety Show
Guesthouse Daughters  (KBS, 2017)

Music video appearances

Radio Programs
 Park Joong-hoon's Popular Songs (1988~1989 KBS Radio 4(Now Cool FM/2FM)/KBS Radio 2 (KBS-FM))
 Park Joong-hoon's Radio Star (January 9, 2017 ~ December 31, 2018 as a DJ/January 9, 2017~present as the producer of the program KBS Radio 2 (KBS-FM))

Accolades

Listicles

References

External links 
 
 

South Korean male film actors
Male actors from Seoul
1966 births
Living people
Chung-Ang University alumni
Best New Actor Paeksang Arts Award (film) winners